Sherry Schrull (née Russell; born February 8, 1958 – June 15, 2007) was an American professional wrestler and manager, better known by her ring names, Sherri Martel and Sensational Sherri.

Martel began her professional wrestling career in the Mid South after training in Columbia, South Carolina. She joined the American Wrestling Association (AWA) in the mid-1980s and held its AWA World Women's Championship three times. In the late 1980s, she joined the World Wrestling Federation (WWF), where she held the WWF Women's Championship. Also in the WWF, Martel continued to act as a manager to wrestlers such as Randy Savage, Ted DiBiase, and Shawn Michaels. She appeared in Extreme Championship Wrestling (ECW) and World Championship Wrestling (WCW) in the 1990s. In the latter, Martel acted as the manager for the tag team Harlem Heat. After leaving WCW, she made few wrestling related appearances until her death in 2007. She also appeared in Total Nonstop Action Wrestling in September 2006 as a manager for Bobby Roode which ended up being her last televised wrestling appearance.

Early life
Sherry Lynn Russell was born on February 8, 1958, in Birmingham, Alabama, and grew up playing basketball and participating in track and field.

Professional wrestling career

Early career (1980–1985)
Martel was first introduced to professional wrestling as a child, when her mother took her and her sister to shows in Mississippi. Their mother initially asked them whether they wanted to attend a wrestling show or go ice skating. In 1974, Martel approached Grizzly Smith for advice on becoming a wrestler, but he questioned her conviction and told her to come back to him in 1980 when she was an adult. She eventually married her second husband and gave birth to a son named Jared, but she soon divorced her husband. During this time, she again became interested in becoming a professional wrestler and sought training from "Mr. Personality" Butch Moore in Memphis, Tennessee. She started wrestling as Sherri Martine, but decided she needed more training. She continued to train at The Fabulous Moolah's school, where Moolah changed her name to Sherri Martel and sent her to wrestle in Japan in 1981. Moolah claims that Martel frequented night clubs and liked to party, which resulted in Moolah kicking her out of the school.

After leaving the school, she traveled back to Tennessee. In Memphis, she was managed by Jim Cornette. During a mixed battle royal, Martel suffered an injury that removed her from wrestling temporarily. She then worked as both a wrestler and manager for Pat Rose and Tom Prichard.

American Wrestling Association (1985–1987)
After Martel recovered, Larry Zbyszko helped her join the American Wrestling Association (AWA). She eventually debuted in the AWA and, on September 28, 1985, at SuperClash in Chicago, she defeated Candi Devine for the AWA World Women's Championship. She traded the belt with Devine, and on June 28, 1986, at "Battle by the Bay," Martel defeated Devine to win the AWA World Women's Championship for a third and final time. Martel, however, only held the title briefly before vacating it.

During this time, in addition to wrestling, Martel acted as the manager for the team of "Playboy" Buddy Rose and "Pretty Boy" Doug Somers, whom she managed to win the AWA World Tag Team Championship. Rose and Somers then engaged in a lengthy feud with The Midnight Rockers (Shawn Michaels and Marty Jannetty), who defeated Rose and Somers for the tag team title on January 27, 1987, in St. Paul, Minnesota.

World Wrestling Federation (1987–1993)

Debut & Women's Champion (1987–1988)
After former AWA wrestler Jesse Ventura referred her to the World Wrestling Federation (WWF), she debuted on July 24, 1987, defeating The Fabulous Moolah for the WWF Women's Championship. Renaming herself Sensational Sherri, she reigned as WWF Women's Champion for fifteen months before losing it to Rockin' Robin on October 8, 1988, in Paris, France. At the Survivor Series in 1987, Martel's team consisting of Martel, Women's World Tag Team Champions The Glamour Girls (Leilani Kai and Judy Martin), Dawn Marie, and Donna Christanello lost to The Fabulous Moolah's team consisting of Moolah, Velvet McIntyre, Rockin' Robin, and the Jumping Bomb Angels (Noriyo Tateno and Itsuki Yamazaki). When the WWF phased out its women's division in 1990, Martel remained with the company and turned her attention to managing male wrestlers.

Concurrent with her reign as WWF Women's Champion, Martel made several appearances in costume as "Peggy Sue," the girlfriend of The Honky Tonk Man, who was in the midst of a run as Intercontinental Champion. Her primary role was to irritate Honky's opponents—namely, Randy "Macho Man" Savage and Brutus "the Barber" Beefcake—and interfere in his matches.

Managing Randy Savage and Ted DiBiase (1989–1992)
  
After WrestleMania V, Martel confronted Miss Elizabeth, manager of newly dethroned former WWF World champion Randy Savage, during an interview, leading to a confrontation between the two in which Savage fired Miss Elizabeth and repeatedly threatened to hit her. Martel then attacked Hulk Hogan from behind as he came to Miss Elizabeth's rescue, leaving him open to a chair attack from Savage, Throughout the remainder of 1989, Martel and Savage feuded with Hogan and Miss Elizabeth. At SummerSlam, Hogan and Brutus "The Barber" Beefcake defeated the team of Savage and Zeus. After the match, Miss Elizabeth knocked out Martel with Martel's purse, and she, Hogan, and Beefcake cut Martel's hair.

At WrestleMania VI in 1990, Martel and Savage lost a mixed tag-team match against Sapphire and Dusty Rhodes after Miss Elizabeth, who was in the corner of Sapphire and Rhodes, interfered and shoved Martel. During that same year, Martel and Savage appeared on Lifestyles of the Rich and Famous with Robin Leach. During a steel cage match at Madison Square Garden, The Ultimate Warrior pulled off an escaping Martel's miniskirt to reveal matching black garter belts and lace underpants. Practically in tears, Martel raced back to the locker room. At WrestleMania VII, Savage lost a "retirement match" against The Ultimate Warrior, in which the loser would be forced (Kayfabe) to retire. After Savage lost the match, an irate Martel attacked Savage but was thrown from the ring by Miss Elizabeth, who had been watching from the audience. Later on the WM7 card after she and Savage parted ways following the career match, Martel came to the ring to help "The Million Dollar Man" Ted DiBiase in his assault on an injured Rowdy Roddy Piper, following which she managed DiBiase until 1992.

Pairing and feuding with Shawn Michaels (1992–1993)
Subsequently, Martel began managing Shawn Michaels after Pat Patterson convinced Michaels to participate in the storyline. In February 1992, during Paul Bearer's interview segment The Funeral Parlor, Sherri declared she was now "in love" with Shawn Michaels, who had just turned on his longtime tag team partner Marty Jannetty. She also sang Michaels' theme song called "Sexy Boy". As part of his gimmick, Michaels would admire himself in a full-length mirror before his matches. In 1992, before a match, Jannetty grabbed the mirror and attempted to hit Michaels with it, but Michaels pulled Martel in front of him. After being hit with the mirror, she was absent from television until the Royal Rumble in January 1993. At the Rumble, she was in a neutral corner for the match between Michaels and Jannetty but eventually turned on Michaels during the match, cementing a face turn. Backstage, Michaels confronted her and Jannetty came to her rescue. The storyline, however, was cut short as Jannetty was released from the company in the midst of the feud. Martel spent the remainder of the year aligned with Tatanka, who aided her in her feud with Luna Vachon and Bam Bam Bigelow. She was released from the World Wrestling Federation during the summer. Two reasons have been given for Sherri's departure: her decision to enroll in cosmetology school and failed drug tests.

USWA (1993)
Towards the end of her time in the WWF, Martel participated in a WWF invasion angle in the USWA, reuniting with Savage. Martel would suffer a similar embarrassment to that which she had suffered at the hands of Warrior when she ran in the ring to aid Savage in a steel cage match in Memphis against his old enemy in the area, Jerry "The King" Lawler, but after accidentally knocking Savage from the ring, she had her dress yanked off by Lawler as she climbed the cage to escape.

Smoky Mountain Wrestling (1993)
After her WWF release, Martel had a brief spell in Smoky Mountain Wrestling, siding with Tracy Smothers in a feud with Tammy Sytch, Brian Lee, as well as several intergender matches with Jim Cornette.

Eastern Championship Wrestling (1993–1994)
She began working in Eastern Championship Wrestling (ECW) in 1993, managing Shane Douglas. Sherri turned on Douglas in a tag match with Brian Pillman, costing Douglas the match on behalf of Ric Flair. At November to Remember on November 13, Martel faced Malia Hosaka in a match.

World Championship Wrestling (1994–1997)

Managing Ric Flair (1994)
Martel signed with World Championship Wrestling (WCW) in 1994. The original plan for her was to manage Kevin and Dave Sullivan against Missy Hyatt and The Nasty Boys, but after Hyatt was fired in February 1994, the proposed rivalry went on with no managers for either team.

Martel made her debut on the April 23 edition of WCW Saturday Night, under the name Sensuous Sherri. In an interview with Gene Okerlund, she said her goal was to find a man that can bring her the WCW World Heavyweight Championship. She was at ringside during at Slamboree on May 22, during the WCW World Heavyweight Championship match between Ric Flair and Barry Windham. On June 24, a title unification match took place at the Clash of the Champions XXVII between WCW World Heavyweight Champion Ric Flair and the WCW International World Heavyweight Champion Sting. Although she revealed in the beginning of the match she sided with Sting (including wearing his signature face paint), it turned out to be a double cross, as she sided with Flair, who won the match and unified the titles, double-teaming Sting, until the newly signed Hulk Hogan made the save.

At Bash at the Beach, Martel tried to help Flair to defeat Hogan in a match by giving him brass knuckles but failed. At the feud's climactic battle, a steel cage match at Halloween Havoc, Martel climbed the cage to aid Flair and in the process had her dress pulled off by Jimmy Hart, Hogan's manager, leaving her dangling from the cage in black lingerie.

Managing Harlem Heat (1994–1997) 
Next, Martel began managing Harlem Heat (Booker T and Stevie Ray) using the name Sister Sherri. She managed the team to seven WCW World Tag Team Championship reigns. In late 1994 (while still managing Harlem Heat in WCW), Martel made a return appearance in ECW managing Shane Douglas and Brian Pillman against Ron Simmons and 2 Cold Scorpio. Back in WCW, Martel had a brief on-screen romance with Col. Robert Parker until October 1996 when Harlem Heat fired him and Martel had a match with him at World War 3 in November. She continued to manage Harlem Heat until she got fired from the group on the July 7, 1997, edition of Nitro.

Later career (1997–2006)
After leaving WCW, Martel won the IWA Mid-South Women's Title defeating Debbie Combs on August 28, 1997. A few weeks later she dropped the title back to Combs.

Early in 1999, Martel competed in a mixed-tag team match for the Apocalypse Wrestling Federation's Heavyweight Championship, a title held predominately by men. Missy Hyatt pinned Martel to win the title. In October 1999, she appeared on the Heroes of Wrestling pay-per-view managing Greg Valentine in a match against George Steele. Also in 1999, she was awarded the AWA Superstars Women's Championship.

In 2000, she made three wrestling television appearances with World Championship Wrestling (WCW). The first was at the Souled Out 2000 pay-per-view event, watching at ringside along with other superstars, the Chris Benoit vs. Sid Vicious matchup for the WCW World Heavyweight Championship. The second was on the January 19, 2000, edition of WCW Thunder where she had a match with Madusa, which she lost. In her third and final appearance in World Championship Wrestling, she had a match with Mona, which she also lost.

She wrestled her very last match at WrestleReunion on January 29, 2005, teaming with Peggy Lee Leather, Amber O'Neal and Krissy Vaine losing to Wendi Richter, Malia Hosaka, Bambi and Jenny Taylor.

In 2005, she took part in a World Wrestling Entertainment (formerly the WWF) storyline with Shawn Michaels and Kurt Angle shortly before WrestleMania 21. She made a return to SmackDown!, singing a parody of Michaels' theme song with Angle.

She was inducted into the WWE Hall of Fame by Ted DiBiase in April 2006. Later that year, she worked for TNA Wrestling, taping a backstage vignette trying to offer her managerial services to "free agent" Bobby Roode that aired on the September 21, 2006 TNA Impact!; it was her last wrestling television appearance.

Personal life
By 2003, she was living in Tennessee with her husband, Robert Schrull, where she helped him renovate houses. She was married and divorced at least twice during her life. She had one son.

Death
On June 15, 2007, Martel died at her mother's residence in McCalla, Alabama, near Birmingham. She was 49 years old. On September 11, 2007, homicide investigators in Tuscaloosa, Alabama, released the toxicology report stating that she died of an overdose with multiple drugs in her system, including high amounts of oxycodone. She was cremated after her death.

Championships and accomplishments
American Wrestling Association
AWA World Women's Championship (3 times)
AWA Superstars of Wrestling
AWA World Women's Championship (1 time)
Cauliflower Alley Club
Other honoree (1994)
International Wrestling Association
IWA Women's Championship (1 time)
Professional Wrestling Hall of Fame
Class of 2014
Southern States Wrestling
Kingsport Wrestling Hall of Fame (Class of 2003)
Women Superstars Uncensored
WSU Hall of Fame (Class of 2009)
World Wrestling Federation
WWF Women's Championship (1 time)
WWE Hall of Fame (Class of 2006)
Wrestling Observer Newsletter
Manager of the Year (1991)

See also
 List of premature professional wrestling deaths

References

References

Further reading

External links
 
 
 
 

1958 births
2007 deaths
20th-century American women
21st-century American women
American female professional wrestlers
Drug-related deaths in Alabama
Fictional queens
People from McCalla, Alabama
Professional wrestlers from Alabama
Professional Wrestling Hall of Fame and Museum
Professional wrestling managers and valets
The Dangerous Alliance members
WWE Hall of Fame inductees
WWF/WWE Women's Champions
Wrestling Observer Newsletter award winners
20th-century professional wrestlers
21st-century professional wrestlers